Shah Zaman Khan Afridi better known as Sudhir or Lala Sudhir (25 January 1921 – 19 January 1997) was a Pakistani actor, director and producer. 

Sudhir was a highly respected film personality.

With his film roles symbolizing valour and bravery, he is known as the first action-hero of Pakistani cinema, appearing in 173 films, including 101 in Punjabi, 70 in Urdu, one in Pashto and one Bollywood before Partition.

Early life
He was born as Shah Zaman Khan Afridi into a Pashtun family on 25 January 1921 in Lahore, where he spent all his life.

Professional career 

Sudhir started his career with a role in a Bollywood film named Farz in 1947 in British India. Afterwards, he migrated to Pakistan. After 1947, he started his career in the Pakistani cinema. His first film was Hichkolay in 1949. He appeared in the hit musical film Dupatta in 1952. In 1954, Sassi was the first ever Urdu film to celebrate a Golden Jubilee. Dulla Bhatti (1956), Mahi Munda (1956) and Yakke Wali (1957) were the highest grossing Punjabi films of the time. Yakke Wali (1957) was the first blockbuster Punjabi film. These two films led to building of large film studios in Pakistan. Sudhir was the hero of  action film Baghi (1956), the first Pakistani film to be shown in China.

He was an "action films hero", but appeared as Hatim Tai in Hatim (1956), as Prince Saleem in the famous film Anarkali (1958), as Mirza Jat in the film Mirza Sahiban (1956), as Mahinwal in the film Sohni (1955) and as Mirza Ghalib in the film Ghalib (1961). He acted in the films Nooran (1957), Jhoomer (1959) and Gul Bakawli (1961) etc. He starred in one of the highest grossing Punjabi films Kartar Singh in 1959. He later appeared in hits such as the film Farangi (1964) and Ajab Khan (1961), on the struggle against the British Raj. His film Jeedar (1965) was the first to reach a Platinum Jubilee status. Maa Puttar (1970) was another Punjabi film to celebrate a Platinum Jubilee. He once fought a real battle with a tiger in film Sahil (1960). He appeared as a sidekick with his son in film Dushman Ki Talash (1978).

Pakistan television 
At a very old age, he had a special appearance on PTV and was interviewed by Izhar Bobby.

Personal life
Sudhir married four times, twice within his extended family. These two marriages were 'arranged marriages' by his elders, which is commonly practiced in Pakistani culture, then with fellow actress Shammi and finally with Pakistani film actress Zeba. His marriage with Zeba lasted a very short time. Zeba later went on to marry actor Mohammad Ali. Sudhir had four sons out of these marriages. He had his elder son Noor Zaman Khan from his first wife. He had one son from his second wife namely Meer Zaman also an actor. He had two sons from actress Shammi – Nadir Zaman Khan and Sikandar Zaman. His younger son Sikandar Zaman Khan is married to renowned playback singer Noor Jehan's granddaughter Fatima. He had no children with Zeba.

Death
Sudhir died on 19 January 1997 and was laid to rest at Defense Society Graveyard in Lahore, Pakistan.

Awards and nominations
 1970 - Nigar Awards (Punjabi films)-Best Actor Award for the film Maa Puttar
 1974 - Nigar Awards (Punjabi films)-Best Actor Award for the film Lottery
 1981 - Nigar Awards-Special Award for 30 years of excellence.

References

External links
 

1921 births
1997 deaths
Pashtun people
Afridi people
Male actors in Hindi cinema
Film directors from Lahore
Pakistani male film actors
Pakistani film producers
Pakistani stunt performers
Male actors from Lahore
Nigar Award winners
20th-century Pakistani male actors